Florent Rouamba (born 31 December 1986) is a Burkinabé professional footballer who plays as a defensive midfielder for Championnat National 2 club Saint-Pryvé Saint-Hilaire. He has represented Burkina Faso at international level.

Career
Rouamba began his career with Union Sportive de Ouagadougou and was in January 2006 scouted from Sheriff Tiraspol. They won in 2006 the league and cup also the double with FC Sheriff. He won the Moldova Championship and Cup in 2008. A highlight of his career was when he scored a 40-yard goal in the Europa Cup against AZ Alkmaar.

After an impressive performance in the African Nations Cup where Burkina Faso lost in the finals to Nigeria, Roumba began to attract more serious attention. On 28 March 2013, Rouamba signed a contract with English club Charlton Athletic until the end of the 2013 season. This was possible because the transfer rules state that players without a club may join a club any time as was the case in joining Charlton Athletic. At the end of the 2012–13 season, he left Charlton without making any first-team appearances.

On 8 January 2014, Rouamba joined French Ligue 2 side CA Bastia.

International
Rouamba had played for the Burkina Faso under-21 team. He is current member for the senior team of his homeland Burkina Faso.

References

External links
 

1986 births
Living people
Burkinabé footballers
FC Sheriff Tiraspol players
Charlton Athletic F.C. players
CA Bastia players
Burkina Faso international footballers
2010 Africa Cup of Nations players
2012 Africa Cup of Nations players
2013 Africa Cup of Nations players
Expatriate footballers in Moldova
Burkinabé expatriate sportspeople in Moldova
Expatriate footballers in England
Expatriate footballers in France
Burkinabé expatriate sportspeople in France
ASFA Yennenga players
Sportspeople from Ouagadougou
2015 Africa Cup of Nations players
US Ouagadougou players
Moldovan Super Liga players
Association football midfielders
21st-century Burkinabé people